The title Baron Butler was created in the Peerage of England in 1666.
The Butler family have several branches ( who descended from Irish-Norman dynasties, all of which descended from Theobald Walter who was Chief Butler of England.

History of the title
Baron Butler of Moore Park, Co. Hertford, was created in the Peerage of England in 1666, for Thomas Butler, 6th Earl of Ossory (the eldest son of the 1st Duke of Ormonde). Four years previously, he had been called up to the Irish House of Lords by a writ of acceleration as the Earl of Ossory. As the Baron predeceased his father, his son James inherited the barony in 1680 and then the dukedom in 1688. However, in 1715 his English titles were attainted because of his part in the Jacobite rising. The title was able to pass through the female line and in 1871, the attainder was reversed for the great-great-great-great-grand-nephew of the second duke, the 7th Earl Cowper. Lord Cowper died childless, however, and the title has been abeyant since 1905.

Barons of the second creation
Thomas Butler, 6th Earl of Ossory, 1st Baron Butler (1634–1680).
James Butler, 2nd Duke of Ormonde, 2nd Baron Butler (1665–1745), attainted 1715.
Francis Thomas de Grey Cowper, 7th Earl Cowper, 3rd Baron Butler (1834–1905), attainder reversed in 1871, abeyant 1905.

Co-heirs
The co-heirs to the barony are the descendants of the sisters of the third baron:

Ralph Matthew Palmer, 12th Baron Lucas of Crudwell (born 1951) (1/6)
Hon. Sarah Nan Loch (born 1949) (1/6)
Julian John William Salmond, Esq. (born 1926) (1/6)
(Henry) Nicolas Gage, 8th Viscount Gage (born 1934) (1/6)
Michael Andrew Foster Jude Kerr, 13th Marquess of Lothian (born 1945) (1/3)

References

Sources

 Alt URL

See also
 Butler dynasty
 Robin Butler, Baron Butler of Brockwell (born 1938), a life peer.
 Rab Butler, Baron Butler of Saffron Walden (1902–1982), Deputy Prime Minister and life peer.
 Walter Butler, 1st Marquess of Ormonde was created Baron Butler of Llanthony in 1801.

Butler dynasty
Abeyant baronies in the Peerage of England
Noble titles created in 1666
Extinct baronies in the Peerage of the United Kingdom
Noble titles created in 1801